Nick DiCeglie is a Republican member of the Florida Legislature representing the state's 18th Senate district, which includes part of Pinellas County, and formerly served in the House's 66th district which covered most of his current Senate seat.

History
DiCeglie grew up in North Woodmere, New York and moved to Florida in 1996.

Florida House of Representatives
DiCeglie defeated Berny Jacques in the August 28, 2018 Republican primary for the 66th district House seat. DiCeglie went on to defeat Democrat Alex Heeren in the November 6, 2018 general election, winning 56.84% of the vote.

References

Republican Party members of the Florida House of Representatives
Living people
21st-century American politicians
Nassau Community College alumni
1973 births
People from North Woodmere, New York
Lawrence High School (Cedarhurst, New York) alumni